Anhembi Parque is a convention center located in Santana, a district of São Paulo, Brazil. At 400,000 square meters of indoor space and 93,000 meters of outdoor space, it is one of the largest event grounds in Latin America. The center is home to 20+ large annual fairs, each drawing in excess of 50,000 visitors, and hosts the annual Carnival of São Paulo.

Venues
Pavilhão de Exposições Caio de Alcântara Machado
Pavilhão Norte/Sul - main exhibition hall
Pavilhão Oeste - annex to main exhibition hall, opened 2 January 2002

Polo Cultural e Esportivo Grande Otelo
Sambódromo do Anhembi, opened 1 February 1991, capacity 29,199
Arena Anhembi - outdoor concert venue, capacity of 40,000, opened on 5 December 2004, originally known as "Arena Skol Anhembi" until August 2012
Nova Arena Anhembi - outdoor venue, primarily used for sporting events and music festivals, capacity of 24,000, opened in 2012
Espaço Anhembi - banquet hall, opened October 2012, capacity 3,200

Palácio das Convenções
Auditório Celso Furtado - auditorium, opened 16 June 1972, capacity 2,502
Auditório Elis Regina - auditorium, opened on 29 July 1985, capacity 799
Auditório 8 - lecture hall, capacity 124
Auditório 9 - lecture hall, capacity 281

Arena Anhembi 
The arena hosts shows for audiences of more than 30,000 people, a space that became the scene of major national and international shows, including:

Aerosmith
Amy Winehouse
Angra
Arcade Fire
Arctic Monkeys
Backstreet Boys
Basement Jaxx
Big Time Rush
Bring Me the Horizon
Britney Spears
Bruno Mars
DAY6
Demi Lovato
Dua Lipa
Carlos Santana
Elton John
Florence and the Machine
Genesis
Green Day
Guns N' Roses
Imagine Dragons
Iron Maiden
Jack Johnson
Jennifer Lopez
John Mayer
Judas Priest
Justin Bieber
Kelly Clarkson
Kings of Leon
Kiss
LCD Soundsystem
Linkin Park
Maroon 5
Metallica
Miley Cyrus
Ne-Yo
Nick Jonas
Oasis
Ozzy Osbourne
RBD
Red Hot Chili Peppers
Rihanna
Roger Waters
Roxette
Sensation 
Sepultura
Shakira 
Simple Plan
Slipknot
System of a Down
The Black Eyed Peas
The Bravery
The Cure
The Killers
The Prodigy
The Strokes
The Wanted
Whitesnake

External links 
Historical archive of convention center

Convention centres in Brazil
Buildings and structures in São Paulo
Tourist attractions in São Paulo